Sherwood Observatory is an amateur astronomical observatory in Nottinghamshire, England, owned and operated by Mansfield and Sutton Astronomical Society. The main dome is 6.5m in diameter and houses a 0.61 m Newtonian Reflecting telescope. There is a club meeting room that hosts society meetings and lectures and also serves as a lecture theatre for the public on open evenings. The complex has workshop, kitchen, office, storage and toilet facilities.

Early history
The first meeting of Mansfield and Sutton Astronomical Society (MSAS) took place in February 1970, and early meetings took place at the premises of a local engineering company. The founding members quickly formed a plan to build an Observatory, and by 1972 a piece of land had been purchased at one of the highest points in Nottinghamshire. Site preparation commenced and the foundations were poured in 1975. All building work was done by members, with the majority of materials being reclaimed from local demolition sites.

The dome itself was designed with the help of the University of Nottingham Architecture department. The main ring-beam and aperture guides for the dome were made from 4x2 inch steel channeling, bent to shape by hand with the aid of a large hydraulic jack normally used to lift heavy goods vehicles. Thirty supporting ribs were then made from T-section aluminium, and 120 sheets of aluminium all individually cut and shaped by hand were fixed to the structure by over 5,000 rivets, each of which was drilled and punched by hand.

With a roof on the lecture theatre the building was now weatherproof and work could commence on the electrical systems and the telescope itself. The main frame of the telescope was built by members from scaffold tubing and mounted on an equatorial fork driven by DC electrical motors for tracking the stars. The main mirror was ground at the observatory by a home-made mirror grinding machine over a period of 4 years, however this piece of glass was damaged when sent away for aluminising. After a period of fundraising a mirror was purchased and installed in the telescope with Messier 42, the Orion Nebula, being the target for first light.

Sherwood Observatory was officially opened in 1986 by the Astronomer Royal, Professor Sir Francis Graham-Smith.

Telescope
The main instrument at Sherwood Observatory is a Newtonian telescope on an equatorial fork mount. The telescope was initially constructed as a Nasmyth reflector, but due to collimation problems it was converted in the 1990s to the simpler Newtonian configuration.

The telescope has stepper motor drive control with an electrical focusser. The dome is electrically driven and will move automatically as the telescope tracks across the sky. Various cameras can be attached to the telescope to record images and video and display what the telescope sees on a 2 metre wide projector screen in the lecture theatre, from where the telescope can be controlled.

See also
List of largest optical telescopes in the British Isles

External links
 Mansfield and Sutton Astronomical Society - official site
 The Federation of Astronomical Societies

References 

Astronomical observatories in England
Buildings and structures in Mansfield
1970 establishments in England
Tourist attractions in Nottinghamshire